Fort Denaud is a census-designated place (CDP) and former fort in Hendry County, Florida, United States. As of the 2020 census,the population of the CDP was 2,049.

History
The fort was first established in 1837 as a supply depot during the Second Seminole War. It was named in honor of Pierre Denaud, a French-Canadian trapper who had owned the land and had traded skins and hides with the Seminole prior to the Seminole War. The fort was reoccupied and was more tactically significant during the Third Seminole War, where it served as a headquarters for several companies of federal troops and as a middle point on the Caloosahatchee river between Fort Myers and Lake Okeechobee. In December 1854, Brevet Major William Hays took command of three companies from the 2nd Artillery Regiment serving in the area. In January of 1855, he moved most of his men to Fort Denaud and established it as his operational base and headquarters. From there, patrols were sent out into Big Cypress Swamp to map out Indian villages as well as along Fisheating Creek. A sketch from 1855 shows that Fort Denaud was connected to a fort opposite the Caloosahatchee called Fort T.B. Adams by a boat bridge. On January 18, 1856, a small army detachment was attacked on the river near Denaud and all but one of the soldiers were killed. 

In 1963, the swing-style Fort Denaud Bridge was built across the Caloosahatchee. The bridge and its current approach stands were put into place at mile 108.2 along Route 78A. On the north side of the river is Fort Denaud Cemetery. On the south side of the Fort Denaud Bridge is a historic marker.

Geography
The Fort Denaud CDP occupies the northwest corner of Hendry County. It is bounded to the north by Glades County, to the southeast by the city of LaBelle, and to the west by Lee County.

The Caloosahatchee River flows through the center of the CDP, running west to tidewater at Fort Myers.

Demographics

Fictional references
A scene from Just Cause, a 1995 suspense crime thriller film directed by Arne Glimcher and starring Sean Connery and Laurence Fishburne, was filmed in Fort Denaud.

References

Census-designated places in Hendry County, Florida
Census-designated places in Florida